Haiku Hands are an alternative dance electronic music group from Sydney and Melbourne, Australia. The group consists of Claire Nakazawa, Beatrice Lewis, Mie Nakazawa, and performing member Mataya Young. The Nakazawa sisters are from Sydney and Lewis is from Melbourne.

Touring
The group toured nationally with Groovin The Moo and Listen Out (festival). They have played festivals including Splendour in the Grass, St Jerome's Laneway Festival, Wonderland Scarehouse Tour, WOMADelaide, Pitch Festival and Party In The Paddock. Haiku Hands have supported Flight Facilities and Bloc Party on their Australian tours. In 2019, they toured with Sofi Tukker.

Members

Discography

Studio albums

Singles

Notes

Awards

AIR Awards
The Australian Independent Record Awards (commonly known informally as AIR Awards) is an annual awards night to recognise, promote and celebrate the success of Australia's Independent Music sector.

! 
|-
| scope="row"| 2020
|  "Dare You Not to Dance"
| Best Independent Dance or Electronica Single
| 
| 
|-
|rowspan="2"| 2021
| Haiku Hands
| Breakthrough Independent Artist of the Year
| 
|rowspan="2"| 
|-
| Haiku Hands
| Best Independent Dance or Electronica Album or EP
| 
|-

External links

References

Australian pop music groups
Musical groups from Melbourne
Musical groups from Sydney
Australian musical trios
Mad Decent artists